Tash-Bashat is a village in Naryn District of Naryn Region of Kyrgyzstan. Its population was 1,439 in 2021.

References
 
 
 

Populated places in Naryn Region